The Scarborough and Whitby by-election was a parliamentary by-election for the British House of Commons constituency of Scarborough and Whitby on 6 May 1931.

Vacancy
The by-election was caused by the resignation of the sitting Conservative MP, Sidney Herbert on 20 April 1931. He had been MP here since winning the seat in 1922.

Election history
The constituency had always returned Unionists since its creation in 1918.  However, the Liberals had come close to winning in 1923. 
The result at the last General election was also close;

Candidates
The local Conservative Association chose 26-year-old Sir Paul Latham as their candidate to defend the seat. He had recently inherited the Latham baronetcy. Latham was a member of the London County Council, representing Lewisham East as a member of the Conservative-backed Municipal Reform Party. At the 1929 general election, he stood as the Conservative candidate in Rotherham,  a safe seat for the Labour Party where he was runner-up with 23% of the votes.

The local Liberals put forward 59-year-old Ramsay Muir as their candidate. He was central to Liberal party policy development in the 1920s. Muir was elected at the 1923 general election as Member of Parliament (MP) for Rochdale in Lancashire, having been unsuccessful in that constituency at the 1922 general election However he was defeated at the 1924 election. He stood for Parliament again without success in
the 1926 by-election for the Combined English Universities
and at the 1929 general election again at Rochdale.

It was apparent from the beginning that there existed a division in the Scarborough Labour Party as to the advisability of putting forward a Candidate. Nevertheless, attempts were made to secure a nomination but without success. A resolution was therefore carried not to enter the contest, which, upon being reported to the National Executive Committee, was endorsed. However, following pressure from the ILP, the local party adopted a Mr Williams as candidate and on 24 April 1931 sought his endorsement by the NEC. However, the NEC refused to endorse him for the following reasons;
(a) The first decision of the Divisional Party not to contest, which the Committee had endorsed. (b) The division in the local ranks, which would have prevented an active campaign. (c) A shortage of financial resources. 
(d) The time factor, as the writ had been issued. The Scarborough Divisional Labour Party loyally abided by the decision of the Executive Committee and did not put forward a Candidate.

Campaign
Polling day was set for 6 May 1931, just 16 days after the resignation of the previous member.

Lloyd George came to speak for Ramsay Muir twice, once in a hall and once in the Excursion Station and attracted large and enthusiastic audiences.

Result
Latham held the seat. There was a small swing to the Liberals;

Aftermath
Latham held the seat at the 1931 general election. Muir however, contested Louth without success. This left the Liberals without a candidate. Muir returned to contest the 1935 general election to Scarborough and Whitby. 
The result at the following General election;

Latham's parliamentary career continued until 1941, when he was arrested for "improper behaviour", a homosexual act, with three gunners and a civilian while serving as an officer in the Royal Artillery.

See also
 List of United Kingdom by-elections
 United Kingdom by-election records

References

Scarborough and Whitby by-election
Scarborough and Whitby by-election
1930s in Yorkshire
Scarborough and Whitby by-election
Politics of the Borough of Scarborough
By-elections to the Parliament of the United Kingdom in North Yorkshire constituencies
Whitby